The 1992 United States Senate election in Colorado was held on November 3, 1992. Incumbent Democratic U.S. Senator Tim Wirth decided to retire instead of seeking a second term. Democratic nominee Ben Nighthorse Campbell, a U.S. Representative, won the open seat. Campbell switched to the Republican Party in 1994.

Democratic primary

Candidates
 Ben Nighthorse Campbell, U.S. Representative
 Josie Heath, former Boulder County Commissioner and nominee for the U.S. Senate in 1990
 Dick Lamm, former Governor of Colorado

Results

General election

Candidates 
 Ben Nighthorse Campbell (D), U.S. Representative
 Terry Considine (R), State Senator

Results

See also
 1992 United States Senate elections

References

1992
1992 Colorado elections
Colorado